Hypna is a butterfly genus of the family Nymphalidae. It is monotypic, containing only Hypna clytemnestra, the jazzy leafwing, marbled leafwing or silver-studded leafwing.

Description
Hypna clytemnestra is the largest member of the tribe Anaeini. This "leafwing butterfly" is quite uncommon. The uppersides of the forewings are black, with a few white spots on the margins and two large white transverse bands. The uppersides of the hindwings are mainly brown. The undersides mimic dead leaves, ranging from dark brown to whitish. Larvae feed on Croton floribundus (Euphorbiaceae), while adults feed on rotting fruits.

Distribution
Hypna clytemnestra can be found from Mexico to the Amazon basin.

Habitat

Philately
This butterfly is on a Cuban stamp with a face value of ¢13.

Subspecies
 H. c. clytemnestra (Nicaragua - Brazil, Suriname)
 H. c. negra C. & R. Felder, 1862 (Peru, Bolivia, Panama)
 H. c. forbesi Godman & Salvin, 1884 (Brazil: Pernambuco)
 H. c. huebneri Butler, 1866 (Brazil)
 H. c. rufescens Butler, 1866 (Venezuela, Colombia)
 H. c. mexicana Hall, 1917 (Mexico: Oaxaca)
 H. c. corymbaensis Talbot, 1928 (Brazil: Mato Grosso)
 H. c. iphigenia Herrich-Schäffer, 1862 (Cuba)

Gallery

References

 Biolib
 Hypna clytemnestra, Butterflies of Amazonia

External links
 Biolib
 Tree of Life
 Catalogue of Life

Charaxinae
 
Nymphalidae of South America
Monotypic butterfly genera
Taxa named by Jacob Hübner
Fauna of Brazil
Butterflies described in 1777
Nymphalidae genera